Édson Campos Martins (12 July 1930 – 12 August 1991) was a Brazilian footballer who competed in the 1952 Summer Olympics.

References

External links
Édson Campos Martins at narod.ru

1930 births
1991 deaths
Association football defenders
Brazilian footballers
Olympic footballers of Brazil
Footballers at the 1952 Summer Olympics
Bangu Atlético Clube players